Aaron Anthony Chalmers (born 2 February 1991) is an English association footballer. His predominant position is as a midfielder for Buxton.

Career
Born in Manchester, he attended Cedar Mount High School in Gorton. He started his professional career with Oldham Athletic in League One. Chalmers senior squad debut came on 12 April 2008 in a 2–0 win versus Leyton Orient, coming on as a substitute in the 74th minute for Matthew Wolfenden. His contract was cancelled on 2 December 2008 following a breach of discipline.

On 25 March 2009, he joined Macclesfield Town on non-contract terms following a trial with the club. He joined Scottish club Hibernian in 2009, where he played for their Under-19 team in central defence.

He then signed on with Mossley in the summer of 2010. He spent the end of that season on loan at Droylsden before being transfer listed in August 2011.

He was transferred for an undisclosed fee to Woodley Sports a few days later. As part of the deal, Mossley would also receive a percentage of any transfer fee received, should he later leave Woodley. The club was renamed in 2012 as Stockport Sports. On 1 July 2012, he signed for Southport. In September, he went on loan to Droylsden.

On 7 August 2014, Chalmers signed for Conference North newcomers Hyde. He made his debut two days later in a 1–0 defeat to Oxford City.

In September 2014 he joined Northwich Victoria making his club debut in a match against Ossett Town.

He left Stalybridge Celtic at the end of the 2016/17 season.

Statistics

References

External links
Aaron Chalmers Bio at Oldham Athletic

[www.mossleyweb.com/MwebFrameSet2011.html Mossley stats] at Mossley AFC

Living people
1991 births
People from Gorton
Association football midfielders
Oldham Athletic A.F.C. players
Macclesfield Town F.C. players
Hibernian F.C. players
Mossley A.F.C. players
Droylsden F.C. players
Stockport Sports F.C. players
Southport F.C. players
Ashton United F.C. players
Hyde United F.C. players
Northwich Victoria F.C. players
English people of Scottish descent
English footballers
English Football League players
Stalybridge Celtic F.C. players
Buxton F.C. players